Bulis is a surname with multiple etymologies. In the Czech Republic, it has a feminine form, Bulisová. Notable people with this surname include:
 Christopher Bulis, English science fiction writer
 Henry C. Bulis (1830–1897), American politician
 Jan Bulis (born 1978), Czech hockey player
 Jānis Bulis (born 1950), Latvian Catholic bishop
 Mor Bulis (born 1996), Israeli tennis player

See also